The surname Roumieu may refer to:
Graham Roumieu, Canadian illustrator
Robert Lewis Roumieu (1814–1877), also known as R.L. Roumieu, Victorian architect in London
Reginald St Aubyn Roumieu (1854–1921), also known as R St A Roumieu, architect and son of Robert Lewis Roumieu